Ishpeming Township is a civil township of Marquette County in the U.S. state of Michigan. The population was 3,392 at the 2020 census.  The city of Ishpeming is to the south, but the two are administered autonomously.

Communities 
 The city of Ishpeming is located at the southeast corner of the township, but is administratively autonomous.

Geography

Demographics
As of the census of 2000, there were 3,522 people, 1,347 households, and 1,035 families residing in the township. There were 1,692 housing units at an average density of 19.6 per square mile (7.6/km2). The racial makeup of the township was 98.50% White, 0.17% African American, 0.43% Native American, 0.20% Asian, 0.06% Pacific Islander, 0.14% from other races, and 0.51% from two or more races. Hispanic or Latino of any race were 0.43% of the population.

There were 1,347 households, out of which 32.4% had children under the age of 18 living with them, 66.2% were married couples living together, 7.3% had a female householder with no husband present, and 23.1% were non-families. 20.0% of all households were made up of individuals, and 8.7% had someone living alone who was 65 years of age or older.  The average household size was 2.53 and the average family size was 2.90.

In the township the population was spread out, with 22.9% under the age of 18, 7.6% from 18 to 24, 24.2% from 25 to 44, 28.0% from 45 to 64, and 17.3% who were 65 years of age or older.  The median age was 42 years. For every 100 females, there were 94.6 males.  For every 100 females age 18 and over, there were 94.8 males.

The median income for a household in the township was $43,139, and the median income for a family was $49,286. Males had a median income of $41,348 versus $22,127 for females. The per capita income for the township was $17,736.  About 5.7% of families and 6.8% of the population were below the poverty line, including 10.0% of those under age 18 and 4.6% of those age 65 or over.

Highways
 passes briefly through the southernmost portion of the township.

Education
Aspen Ridge Elementary School, Aspen Ridge Middle School and Westwood High School serve the township.

References

External links
NICE Community Schools
http://www.exploringthenorth.com/ishpeming/ish.html

Townships in Marquette County, Michigan
Townships in Michigan